The 1984 Major League Baseball All-Star Game was the 55th midseason exhibition between the all-stars of the American League (AL) and the National League (NL), the two leagues comprising Major League Baseball. The game was played on July 10, 1984, at Candlestick Park in San Francisco, home of the San Francisco Giants of the National League. The game resulted in a 3-1 victory for the NL.

Roster
Players in italics have since been inducted into the National Baseball Hall of Fame.

American League All-Stars
Joe Altobelli: Baltimore Orioles manager

Starters
C Lance Parrish: Detroit Tigers
1B Rod Carew: California Angels
2B Lou Whitaker: Detroit Tigers
3B George Brett: Kansas City Royals
SS Cal Ripken Jr.: Baltimore Orioles
LF Dave Winfield: New York Yankees
CF Chet Lemon: Detroit Tigers
RF Reggie Jackson: California Angels
P Dave Stieb: Toronto Blue Jays

Pitchers
Mike Boddicker: Baltimore Orioles
Bill Caudill: Oakland Athletics
Rich Dotson: Chicago White Sox
Willie Hernández: Detroit Tigers
Jack Morris: Detroit Tigers
Phil Niekro: New York Yankees
Dan Quisenberry: Kansas City Royals

Reserves
C Dave Engle: Minnesota Twins
C Jim Sundberg: Milwaukee Brewers
1B Alvin Davis: Seattle Mariners
1B Don Mattingly: New York Yankees
2B Damaso Garcia: Toronto Blue Jays
3B Buddy Bell: Texas Rangers
SS Alfredo Griffin: Toronto Blue Jays
SS Alan Trammell: Detroit Tigers
OF Tony Armas: Boston Red Sox
OF Rickey Henderson: Oakland Athletics
OF Jim Rice: Boston Red Sox
DH Eddie Murray: Baltimore Orioles
DH Andre Thornton: Cleveland Indians

National League All-Stars
Paul Owens: Philadelphia Phillies manager

Starters
C Gary Carter: Montreal Expos
1B Steve Garvey: San Diego Padres
2B Ryne Sandberg: Chicago Cubs
3B Mike Schmidt: Philadelphia Phillies
SS Ozzie Smith: St. Louis Cardinals
LF Tony Gwynn: San Diego Padres
CF Dale Murphy: Atlanta Braves
RF Darryl Strawberry: New York Mets
P Charlie Lea: Montreal Expos

Pitchers
Joaquín Andújar: St. Louis Cardinals
Dwight Gooden: New York Mets
Rich Gossage: San Diego Padres
Al Holland: Philadelphia Phillies
Jesse Orosco: New York Mets
Mario Soto: Cincinnati Reds
Bruce Sutter: St. Louis Cardinals
Fernando Valenzuela: Los Angeles Dodgers

Reserves
C Bob Brenly: San Francisco Giants
C Jody Davis: Chicago Cubs
C Tony Peña: Pittsburgh Pirates
1B Keith Hernandez: New York Mets
2B Juan Samuel: Philadelphia Phillies
3B Tim Wallach: Montreal Expos
SS Rafael Ramírez: Atlanta Braves
OF Chili Davis: San Francisco Giants
OF Mike Marshall: Los Angeles Dodgers
OF Jerry Mumphrey: Houston Astros
OF Tim Raines: Montreal Expos
OF Claudell Washington: Atlanta Braves

Umpires

Game summary

The National Leaguers drew first blood in the first off Dave Stieb when Steve Garvey singled to right and went to second on an error by Reggie Jackson.  Garvey then scored on another error by catcher Lance Parrish after Dale Murphy singled.  In the second, George Brett tied it with a homer off Charlie Lea, and game MVP Gary Carter quickly gave the NL the lead back with a shot off Dave Stieb.

The game would remain 2-1, NL, for five more innings with two noteworthy pitching performances by National League pitchers along the way.  Fernando Valenzuela struck out Dave Winfield, Reggie Jackson, and George Brett in the fourth, and 19-year-old Dwight Gooden fanned Lance Parrish, Chet Lemon, and Alvin Davis in the fifth.

Dale Murphy added a homer in the eighth off Willie Hernández for the final 3-1 margin.  Goose Gossage got the save.  The game set a nine-inning All-Star Game record for most strikeouts (21)--which would be broken in 1999.

Huey Lewis and the News sang the United States National Anthem prior to the game, with the Presidio of San Francisco color guard presenting the colors and airplanes from Travis Air Force Base flying over Candlestick Park at the Anthem's conclusion.  The ceremonial first pitch ceremony featured Carl Hubbell.

External links
Baseball Almanac
Baseball-Reference.com

Major League Baseball All-Star Game
Major League Baseball All-Star Game
Baseball competitions in San Francisco
Major League Baseball All-Star Game
Major League Baseball All-Star Game